The 2023 Nigerian Senate elections in Bayelsa State will be held on 25 February 2023, to elect the 3 federal Senators from Bayelsa State, one from each of the state's three senatorial districts. The elections will coincide with the 2023 presidential election, as well as other elections to the Senate and elections to the House of Representatives; with state elections being held two weeks later. Primaries were held between 4 April and 9 June 2022.

Background
In terms of the previous Senate elections, none of the three incumbent senators were returned as both Emmanuel Paulker (PDP-Central) and Ben Murray-Bruce (PDP-East) retired from the Senate while Foster Ogola (PDP-West) lost renomination. In the Central district, Douye Diri retained the seat for the PDP with 54% of the vote while Lawrence Ewhrudjakpo held the West district for the PDP with 71%; on the other hand, Biobarakuma Degi (APC) gained the East district from the PDP with 46% of the vote. These senatorial results were an example of APC gains in the state as the party also gained two House of Representatives seats and Bayelsa swung the most towards Buhari in the presidential election of any state. Later in 2019, the swing towards the APC dramatically increased as its gubernatorial nominee David Lyon controversially won by a large margin but Diri was declared victor after Lyon was disqualified before the inauguration. Ensuing senate by-elections in 2020 were then easily won by the PDP, cementing the state's potentially erratic voting record.

Soon after starting their terms, the three newly elected senators gained notability as all three took part in the 2019 Bayelsa State gubernatorial election: Diri was the PDP nominee with Ewhrudjakpo as his deputy running mate while Degi was deputy running mate to APC nominee David Lyon. Although Lyon won the election, albeit controversially, discrepancies in Degi's documentation led the Supreme Court to disqualify the ticket and award victory to Diri and Ewhrudjakpo. When they took office in February 2020, their Senate seats were vacated leading to December 2020 by-elections. The PDP held both seat with Moses Cleopas gaining 86% in the East district while Henry Seriake Dickson won in the West district also with 86%.

Overview

Summary

Bayelsa Central 

The Bayelsa Central Senatorial District covers the local government areas of Kolokuma/Opokuma, Southern Ijaw, and Yenagoa. In 2019, Douye Diri (PDP) was elected to the seat with 53.9% of the vote; however, Diri was elected Governor of Bayelsa State later that year and left the Senate in February 2020. Thus the incumbent is Moses Cleopas (PDP), who was elected with 85.8% of the vote in a December 2020 by-election. Cleopas sought election to a full term but was defeated in the PDP primary.

Primary elections

All Progressives Congress 

On May 28, two candidates contested a direct primary that ended with former Southern Ijaw Local Government Chairman Timipa Tiwei Orunimighe emerging as the nominee after results showed him defeating lawyer Julie Okah-Donli by a significant margin.

People's Democratic Party 

The indirect primary was beset by controversy when Cleopas' name was replaced on the ballot paper with a different name; although the primary organisers eventually printed new ballots, Cleopas had already rejected the process and walked out of the venue. After collation, results showed a sizable win for Konbowei Benson—former Secretary to the State Government and former Speaker of the Bayelsa State House of Assembly. Cleopas challenged the Benson's eligibility at the Federal High Court but Benson's candidacy was upheld in a late November ruling.

General election

Results

Bayelsa East 

The Bayelsa East Senatorial District covers the local government areas of Brass, Ogbia, and Nembe. The incumbent Biobarakuma Degi (APC), who was elected with 45.7% of the vote in 2019, is seeking re-election.

Primary elections

All Progressives Congress 

In the months before the primary, controversy emerged over Degi's re-election campaign; according to opposing community groups and others, the office is meant to be rotated between the district's three local government areas and Degi's renomination would violate this informal zoning agreement. Despite the scandal, on May 28, Degi was renominated over former House of Representatives member Sodaguo Festus Omini in a landslide.

People's Democratic Party 

On the primary date, three candidates contested an indirect primary that ended with former Chief of Staff to the State Government Benson Agadaga winning the nomination after results showed him defeating Jude Amiditor Rex-Ogbuku—former Executive Secretary of the Federal Character Commission—by a 24% margin.

General election

Results

Bayelsa West 

The Bayelsa West Senatorial District covers the local government areas of Ekeremor and Sagbama. In 2019, Lawrence Ewhrudjakpo (PDP) was elected to the seat with 70.9% of the vote; however, Ewhrudjakpo was elected Deputy Governor of Bayelsa State later that year and left the Senate in February 2020. Thus the incumbent is Henry Seriake Dickson (PDP), who was elected with 86.3% of the vote in a December 2020 by-election. Dickson is running for election to a full term.

Primary elections

All Progressives Congress 

On May 28, two candidates contested a direct primary that ended with Wilson Ayakpo Dauyegha—MHA for Ekeremor II—defeating Robinson Etolor in a landslide.

People's Democratic Party 

In the months before the primary, controversy emerged over Dickson's re-election campaign; according to opposing community groups and others, the office is meant to be rotated between the district's two local government areas and Dickson's renomination would violate this informal zoning agreement. In contrast, pro-Dickson groups claim that the zoning agreement was never followed or recognized and thus Dickson can run for re-election. Despite the controversy, Dickson was renominated over Donald Daunemeghan in a landslide.

General election

Results

See also 
 2023 Nigerian Senate election
 2023 Nigerian elections

References 

Bayelsa State
senatorial
Bayelsa State Senate elections